Epic Battle Fantasy  is a series of five Fantasy-themed JRPG turn-based strategy Flash games created by web animator and game developer Matt Roszak, heavily inspired by the Final Fantasy series. The first two games in the series were released in 2009, the third in 2010, the fourth in 2013, and the most recent, the fifth, a reboot rather than a continuation of the previous titles, in 2018.
The games have all been developed in Adobe Flash for browser and desktop PC, but have also been ported to mobile.

Characters in Epic Battle Fantasy 
There are five playable characters in Epic Battle Fantasy. Matt is a swordsman. Natalie is a mage. Lance is a gunman. Anna is a Ranger. NoLegs is a cat that holds a sword and shield.

Matt is the warrior of the team, present since the first game. 

Natalie is the mage of the team and has been present since the first game. She is the most responsible member of the team, and a frequent source of fanservice.

Lance is a human soldier that has appeared in each game since Epic Battle Fantasy 2. While he initially serves as the villain, a fascist attempting to conquer the world, in Epic Battle Fantasy 2, but then joins the party afterwards. He appears as a regular character in 3 and 4, before becoming a villain and fascist once more in 5 and again rejoining the party.

Anna is a ranger from Greenwood Village. Though she debuts in the side game Bullet Heaven, her first appearance in a main series game occurs in Epic Battle Fantasy 4, in which she seeks out Matt, Natalie, and Lance, the prime suspects in the theft of the village's sacred jewel, and leads them into battle with the world's creator, Godcat.

NoLegs is a blue limbless cat that accompanies the party. He fights with a sword and shield, though like the other characters, he can wield other weapons and random objects in a similar manner. Despite first appearing in Epic Battle Fantasy 1 and assisting the party since Epic Battle Fantasy 2, NoLegs did not become playable until Epic Battle Fantasy 5.

Epic Battle Fantasy
The first installment in the series was released on May 1, 2009, on Newgrounds.

Epic Battle Fantasy 2
The second installment was released on August 20, 2009, on Newgrounds.

Epic Battle Fantasy 3
The third installment was released on September 1, 2010, on Steam and two weeks later, on September 12, on Newgrounds.

Epic Battle Fantasy 4
The fourth installment was released on February 24, 2013 on Steam and on March 10 the same year on Newgrounds. The game was also included in the "Overwhelmingly Positive" Humble Bundle released in January 2017.

Epic Battle Fantasy 5
The fifth installment in the series was released on Steam on December 1, 2018, then on January 21, 2020, on Newgrounds. The robot Canti from the anime/manga series FLCL made an appearance in this game. This game was the first in the series released in both English and Japanese. It was additionally released in French, German, Polish, Russian, traditional and simplified Chinese, and Vietnamese.

Reception
On Destructoid, writer Nior called the series "charming as hell" with a "frankly staggering amount of content on offer."

The third installment received a B score from Japanese gaming site Gekikarareview.com.

Hikaru Nomura of IGN Japan called the fifth installment of the series "an otaku JRPG, made by a JRPG otaku" and gave it an 8/10 in an in-depth review and later included the game on place 3 on his personal 2019 Game of the Year list. It was listed as the best free game of February 2020 on the Italian site ICrewPlay.com.

Fandom
Several fanfics based on the Epic Battle Fantasy universe have been written, both in English and Japanese.

References

Flash games
Browser games